San Miguel National High School (Filipino: Pambansang Mataas na Paaralan ng San Miguel) is a government-funded secondary educational institution located in the municipality of San Miguel, Bulacan in the Philippines. It offers the three curricula endorsed by the Department of Education: the Science, Technology, Engineering Program (STE) (formerly known as Special Science Class, the Basic Education Curriculum and the Special Program for Sports / Arts (SPS / SPA).

History

San Miguel National High School, formerly San Miguel High School is one of the most active and known public schools in the Central Luzon region. It is located along Scuala St., Brgy. San Juan, San Miguel, Bulacan. The school opened its first class in the 1946, with a two-storey wooden building (also known as the Main Building) structured at the main entrance of the campus. After a successful pilot school test, the school land area also increased as famous and generous families in the town donated land for school expansions.

In January 2016, the Main Building was mysteriously burned resulting damages with surrounding buildings. As a result, many buildings are being built today through the efforts of the Local Government Units and the Department of Education.

Today, San Miguel National High School caters estimated 10,000 students coming out majority from the town, and others from its neighboring towns: Candaba, Pampanga; Gapan, Nueva Ecija; Doña Remedios Trinidad, San Ildefonso and San Rafael in Bulacan.

Official Publication 
Ang Mayumo (Opisyal na Pahayagan sa Filipino ng Pambansang Mataas na Paaralan ng San Miguel)
The Mayumo (Official Student Publication of San Miguel National High School)
The two publications are highly respected school papers in San Miguel, in Bulacan, and in Central Luzon. The two papers and the editors are noted for its numerous distinction and active participation in different categories  in the Division Schools Press Conference, the Regional Schools Press Conference and the National Schools Press Conference.

Currently, the advisers of these publications are highly respected in student publications, they were:
 Mr. Allan Jason P. Sarmiento (current adviser of The Mayumo)
 Mrs. Maria Rizalyn M. Roque (current adviser of Ang Mayumo)

Clubs and Organizations 
 Supreme Student Government Organization (SSG)
 Youth for Environment Schools Organization (YES-O)
 Math Club
 English Club
 NDEP Club
 Book Lover's Club
 SMNHS Chorale
 SMNHS Brass Band
 Waminal Achievers Club
 Samafil (Samahan ng Mga Mag-aaral sa Filipino)
 Teatro De Mayumo
 YELS (young earth lovers society)
 LYR (League of Young Researchers)
SMNHS dancesports
Population Education Club (PopEd)

References 

High schools in Bulacan